Carnevali is a surname. Notable people with the surname include:
 Alberto Carnevali (1914 - 1953), Venezuelan politician
Daniel Carnevali (born 1946), Argentine former football goalkeeper
 (author abbreviation: Carnevali, born 1955), Venezuelan botanist
Vito Carnevali (1888- c. 1960), composer of classical music

See also
 Carnevale (disambiguation)